The 1965 Christchurch mayoral election was part of the New Zealand local elections held that same year. In 1965, election were held for the Mayor of Christchurch plus other local government positions. The polling was conducted using the standard first-past-the-post electoral method.

Background
Sitting mayor George Manning was re-elected for a fourth time, defeating his main opponent councillor Peter Skellerup of the Citizens' Association and two other candidates. Labour gained an extra seat on the city council, but lost it after special votes were counted. This left the composition of the council at seven seats to twelve in favour of the Citizens' Association.

Mayoralty results
The following table gives the election results:

Councillor results

References

Mayoral elections in Christchurch
1965 elections in New Zealand
Politics of Christchurch
October 1965 events in New Zealand
1960s in Christchurch